Sir Hugh Myddelton (or Middleton), 1st Baronet (1560 – 10 December 1631) was a Welsh clothmaker, entrepreneur, mine-owner, goldsmith, banker and self-taught engineer. The spelling of his name is inconsistently reproduced, but Myddelton appears to be the earliest, and most consistently used in place names associated with him.

Early life
Myddelton was born in 1560 at Galch Hill, Denbighshire, Wales. He as the sixth son of Richard Myddelton, governor of Denbigh Castle in Wales and MP for Denbigh Boroughs and Jane Dryhurst, daughter of Hugh Dryhurst and Lucy ( Grimsditch) Dryhurst.  Among his brothers were Sir Thomas Myddelton, Lord Mayor of London, William Middelton, poet and seaman, and Robert Myddelton, also an MP.

Career

He travelled to seek his fortune in London and after being apprenticed to London goldsmith Thomas Hartopp, becoming so successful in that trade that he was appointed Royal Jeweller by King James I. In the meantime, he became an alderman and then recorder of Denbigh, and in 1603 succeeded his father as MP for Denbigh Boroughs, which he remained until 1628. He also became a very wealthy merchant and clothmaker.

New River
Myddelton is best remembered as the driving force behind the construction of the New River, an ambitious engineering project to bring clean water into London. It was not initially a financial success, and cost Myddelton substantial sums, although in 1612 he was successful in securing monetary assistance from King James I.

In 1619, the New River Company was incorporated by royal charter, one of the first joint-stock utility companies, with Myddelton as governor. The company would continue to be a powerful and extremely profitable force in London's water supply for nearly 300 years.

Mining activities
In 1617, Myddelton obtained large profits from lead and silver mines at Bronfloydd, Cwmerfyn and Cwmsymlog in Cardiganshire, Wales. Working those mines involved building aqueducts to serve the stamp mills needed to crush the ore. Following engineering works at Brading on the Isle of Wight, he was created a baronet on 22 October 1622.

Personal life

Myddelton was twice married. His first wife was Anne ( Collins) Edwards, whom he married shortly before 5 November 1585. Anne, a widow of Richard Edwards of London, was a daughter of Collins of Lichfield, Staffordshire. After Anne's death in 1597, he married Elizabeth Olmstead, daughter and heiress of John Olmstead of Ingatestone, Essex, in 1598. Myddelton's second marriage was presumably arranged by his brother, Sir Thomas, the bride's stepfather. Between his two wives, he had ten sons and six daughters, including William Middleton (1603–), who served as MP for Denbigh from 1630 and 1647. 

He died in December 1631 at Bush Hill, London, and was buried in the church of St. Matthew Friday Street. He was succeeded in the baronetcy by his son William. His widow died on 19 July 1643.

Memorials
There is a statue of Myddelton on Islington Green. Myddleton is also depicted in a statue situated in a niche of the northeastern step-building of the Holborn Viaduct. On an island in the New River at Great Amwell a stone memorial is dedicated to Myddelton. A blue plaque marks the site of his former residence at the end of Cunard Crescent in Enfield. 

In Clerkenwell, not far from the original southern end of the New River, Myddelton Square takes its name from him, as do Myddelton Passage and Myddleton Street.  Institutions nearby (some closed) that are named after him include Hugh Myddelton Primary School in Myddelton Street; the Myddelton Wing of the LSE Rosebery Hall of Residence, also on Myddelton Street; Hugh Myddelton Secondary school (which closed in the mid 1960s in Sans Walk, Islington); and Myddelton House on Pentonville Road, central office of Citizens Advice. 

Bounded by the former course along the valley of Turkey Brook, Myddelton House at Bulls Cross, Enfield (now the headquarters of the Lee Valley Regional Park Authority) was also named in his honour; it was built by Henry Carrington Bowles (formerly a print and map maker of St Paul's Churchyard) whose wife, Anne Garnault, was a member of a Huguenot family with a controlling interest in the New River Company. There is also a Myddleton Arms on New North Road in Canonbury, curiously with that spelling.

Myddelton Avenue in Finsbury Park, parallel to Brownswood Road and the site of one of the New River Reservoirs, also is named for him. At the northern end of the New River, Myddleton Road in Ware is situated close to the source of the river. Myddelton Road in Bowes Park crosses the New River at a point where it goes underground between there and the Hornsey water treatment works, where there is another Myddelton Road off Hornsey High Street.

References
Notes

Sources

Sources

External links
biography in Science & Society Picture Library
page 534 of Tallis's Topographical Dictionary of England and Wales, published 1860
Water-related Infrastructure in Medieval London
Welsh Biography Online – Myddleton family
Biography

1560 births
1631 deaths
Hugh
Welsh civil engineers
London water infrastructure
People from Denbigh
Baronets in the Baronetage of England
16th-century English people
Thames Water
Members of the Parliament of England (pre-1707) for constituencies in Wales
English MPs 1604–1611
English MPs 1614
English MPs 1621–1622
English MPs 1624–1625
English MPs 1625
English MPs 1626
English MPs 1628–1629